Khairi Dam is an earthfill dam on the Kar river near Jamkhed, Ahmednagar district in the state of Maharashtra in India.

Specifications

Purpose
The main purpose of the dam is irrigation for the surrounding area, with water from the resulting spillway and reservoir.

See also
 Dams in Maharashtra
 List of reservoirs and dams in India

References

Dams in Ahmednagar district
Dams completed in 1989
Earth-filled dams
1989 establishments in Maharashtra